Lake Maratanza is the highest lake in New York's Shawangunk Ridge at 2,245 feet (684 m) above sea level. It is within Sam's Point Preserve.

The lake is dammed and supplies drinking water to  Ellenville. The outlet brook drains to the other side of the ridge, into the Verkeerder Kill, a tributary of the Shawangunk Kill and by extension the Wallkill River.

See also
List of dams and reservoirs in New York

Reservoirs in New York (state)
Shawangunks
Protected areas of Ulster County, New York
Reservoirs in Ulster County, New York